EIA RF Connectors are used to connect two items of high power radio frequency rigid or semi-rigid (flexline) coaxial transmission line.  Typically these are only required in very high power transmitting installations (above 3kW at VHF to MW) where the feedline diameters may be several inches. The connectors are always female, requiring a male coupling element or bullet to make the connection. The EIA under the Electronic Components Industry Association (http://www.ecianow.org/), are responsible for a number of standard imperial connector sizes.

Dimensions
The flange design, inner and outer conductor dimensions are standardized, by EIA, in the RS-225, 50 Ω (ohm), and RS-259, 75 Ω, standards.  They are commonly referred to by the inner diameter of the outer conductor in fractional inches. Sizes covered under these two standards range from 3/8 to 6 1/8 inch outside diameter (OD) for 50 Ω and 3/8 to 3 1/8 inch OD for 75 Ω.
Peak pulse power handling, driven by voltage breakdown, is more or less frequency independent for any given size (and can be deduced by assuming ~300 V RMS per mm of inner to outer spacing), but the average power, limited by losses heating the centre conductors, increases approximately with the square root of the operating frequency. Commonly the limit is quoted as that dissipation that will raise the inner temperature to 100 °C when the outer is maintained constant at +40 °C. Field failures can occur at power levels well below this if the central bullet connections are not making uniform positive contact and free of contamination. Conversely the average power ratings can be significantly exceeded if there is forced air flow either through the inner conductor or through the void between the inner and outer conductors. Many years ago, the two RS standards were considered obsolete by EIA. Only recently (until 2007) there has been an effort by manufacturers in the US to update these standards.

The 7/8" is the smallest size EIA type in common use.  Below this, other types such as the DIN7/16 are more popular.

International standards
The corresponding International standards are published by the International Electrotechnical Commission: IEC 60339-1 and IEC 60339-2. These standards are more complete as they include many additional sizes that are missing in the EIA standards.

Interchangeability
Many of these sizes are also interchangeable with RF Connectors defined by the US military in MIL-DTL-24044.

Gallery

Manufacturers
 Dielectric
 Exir Broadcasting
 Radio Frequency Systems
 Alan Dick
 Andrew
 Shively Labs
 JACAL conectores coaxil
 Myat Industries
Electronics Research
 SPINNER GmbH
 SIRA srl
 SILEX SYSTEM TELECOM
www.brackemfg.com

References

RF connectors
EIA standards